The 2017–18 Harvard Crimson men's basketball team represented Harvard University during the 2017–18 NCAA Division I men's basketball season. The Crimson, led by 11th-year head coach Tommy Amaker, played their home games at Lavietes Pavilion in Boston, Massachusetts as members of the Ivy League. They finished the season 18–14, 12–2 in Ivy League play to share the Ivy League regular season championship with Penn. As the No. 1 seed in the Ivy League tournament, they defeated Cornell in the semifinals before losing to Penn in the championship game. As a regular season league champion, and No. 1 seed in their league tournament, who failed to win their league tournament, they received an automatic bid to the National Invitation Tournament where they lost in the first round to Marquette.

Previous season 
The Crimson finished the 2016–17 season 18–10, 10–4 in Ivy League play to finish in second place. They lost in the semifinals of the inaugural Ivy League tournament to Yale.

Offseason

Departures

2017 recruiting class

2018 recruiting class

Roster

Schedule and results
The team earned a share of the 2017–18 Ivy League men's basketball season regular season title.

|-
!colspan=9 style=|Regular season

|-
!colspan=9 style=| Ivy League tournament

|-
!colspan=9 style=| NIT

Source

References

Harvard Crimson men's basketball seasons
Harvard
Harvard Crimson men's basketball
Harvard Crimson men's basketball
Harvard
Harvard Crimson men's basketball
Harvard Crimson men's basketball